The Church of St. Francis of Assisi was built in 1661 by the Portuguese in the Portuguese Viceroyalty of India. The Church of St. Francis of Assisi, together with a convent, was established by eight Portuguese Franciscan friars who landed in Goa in 1517. It is part of the World Heritage Site, Churches and convents of Goa.

The structure
The following is the information as seen on the plaque beside the Church of St. Francis of Assisi.

Above the tabernacle in the main altar is a large statue of St. Francis of Assisi and Jesus on the cross, statues of St. Peter and St. Paul are seen below.  The adjoining walls of nave retain painted panels depicting scenes from the life of St Francis of Assisi."

References

Colonial Goa
Roman Catholic churches completed in 1661
17th-century Roman Catholic church buildings in India
1661 establishments in India
1660s establishments in Portuguese India
Monuments and memorials in Goa
Baroque church buildings in India
Portuguese colonial architecture in India
1661 establishments in the Portuguese Empire
Franciscan churches in India
Roman Catholic churches in Old Goa
Roman Catholic churches in Goa